PP-16 Rawalpindi-X is a Constituency of Provincial Assembly of Punjab.

2008—2013: PP-11 (Rawalpindi-XI)

2013—2018: PP-11 (Rawalpindi-XI)
General elections were held on 11 May 2013. Raja Rashid Hafeez won this seat with 44430 votes.

All candidates receiving over 1,000 votes are listed here.

2018—2023 PP-16 (Rawalpindi-XI)
From 2018 PP-11 (Rawalpindi-XI) Become PP-16 (Rawalpindi-XI) With Some changes has follow (a) The following Census Charges of Rawalpindi City (1) Charge No.15 (2) Charge No.16 (3) Charge No.17 (4) Charge No.21 excluding Circle No. 1 and 2 (5) Charge No.22 (6) Charge No.24 and (7) Charge No.26 excluding Circle No. 1 and 2 of Rawalpindi District.

See also
 PP-15 Rawalpindi-IX
 PP-17 Rawalpindi-XI

References

External links
 Election commission Pakistan's official website
 Awazoday.com check result
 Official Website of Government of Punjab

R